USS Comber has been the name of more than one United States Navy ship, and may refer to:

 , a minesweeper in commission from 1917 to 1919
 , a proposed Tench-class submarine cancelled in 1944 before construction could begin

United States Navy ship names